The following is a list of foreign-language films that have won an Academy Award.

Criteria
The Academy of Motion Picture Arts and Sciences has given Academy Awards to foreign language films since 1945. The Academy defines a foreign language film as a feature-length motion picture produced outside the United States that contains primarily non-English dialogue. Films that meet these criteria are eligible for the Academy Award for Best International Feature Film. They can be nominated for awards in categories other than Best International Feature Film provided that they have been commercially released in Los Angeles County and comply with the special rules governing those categories. In addition, foreign-language films produced in the United States are not eligible for Best International Feature Film, but are eligible for awards in other categories.

History
As of 2008, 24 foreign language films have won Academy Awards outside the Best International Feature Film category. The foreign language films with the most awards are Sweden's Fanny and Alexander, Taiwan's Crouching Tiger, Hidden Dragon, and South Korea’s Parasite  with four awards each, including the Academy Award for Best International Feature Film. Crouching Tiger, Hidden Dragon and Roma received ten Academy Award nominations including Best Picture, the highest number of nominations ever garnered for a foreign language film.

The Academy of Motion Picture Arts and Sciences has invited the film industries of various countries to submit their best film for the Academy Award for Best Foreign Language Film since 1956. The Foreign Language Film Award Committee oversees the process and reviews all the submitted films. Following this, they vote via secret ballot to determine the five nominees for the award. Before the competitive award was created in 1956, the Board of Governors of the Academy voted on a film every year that was considered the best foreign language film released in the United States, and there were no submissions. These films were recipients of Academy Honorary Awards.

Other categories

Films that are eligible for the Best International Feature Film category are able to compete for other Academy Awards if they had been commercially released in Los Angeles County and fulfill the requirements of the categories they are participating in. Among the foreign language films that have won Academy Awards outside the Best Foreign Language Film category, six have won the Academy Award for Best International Feature Film while two, Shoeshine and Gate of Hell have received an Academy Honorary Award. Parasite is the only foreign film to win Best Picture so far although The Artist was the first silent film in French production to win Best Picture, but it was not submitted for the Academy Award for Best Foreign Language Film due to it being ineligible. Roma won the award because it was a co-production of United States and Mexico.

Notes
 Received an Academy Honorary Award as the best foreign language film in 1954 at the 27th Academy Awards
 Received an Academy Award for Best International Feature Film in addition to awards in other categories
 Not eligible for the Academy Award for Best Foreign Language Film because it was a U.S. production.
 Received an Academy Award for Best Picture, but it was not eligible or submitted for the Academy Award for Best Foreign Language Film.
 Received an Academy Award, but it was a U.S. co-production.

Academy Award-winning foreign language films using English dubbage

References
General

Specific

External links
The Official Academy Awards Database

IMDb Academy Awards Page

Academy Award for Best International Feature Film